Pickle boat or pickleboat may refer to;

 Pickle boat, the last boat to finish the Port Huron to Mackinac Boat Race
 Pickle boat (pickleball), the name origin for the sport.